James Ashmore Creelman (September 21, 1894 – September 9, 1941) was a film writer in Hollywood.

Biography
He was born on September 21, 1894, in Marietta, Ohio. He was the second son of James Creelman, the journalist and Alice Leffingwell Buell. He had a sister, Eileen Creelman, who married Frederick Morgan Davenport Jr., son of New York congressman Frederick Morgan Davenport.

Creelman moved to  New York City and then Washington, D.C. where his father worked as a journalist.

He was a graduate of Yale University, where he edited campus humor magazine The Yale Record with Clements Ripley, writer of Jezebel.

Creelman worked for RKO studios from 1929 and contributed to the storyline of many of the studios' early adventure and thriller films including The Untamed Lady, The Most Dangerous Game, King Kong, Dancers in the Dark and  The Last Days of Pompeii.

Creelman began working in Hollywood in 1924 and wrote for 30 films before stopping in 1935. He also directed the 1927 film High Hat.

On September 9, 1941, twelve days before his 47th birthday, Creelman committed suicide by jumping off the roof garden at the top of a building on 325 E. 72nd Street in Manhattan, New York City, New York. He was pronounced dead at Metropolitan Hospital.

Personal life
His paternal grandfather was born to Scots-Irish migrants to Montreal while his paternal grandmother was of Scottish descent. His mother was a native of Marietta, Ohio.

References

External links

1894 births
1941 suicides
American male screenwriters
American people of Canadian descent
Writers from New York City
People from Marietta, Ohio
Suicides by jumping in New York City
Yale University alumni
Screenwriters from New York (state)
20th-century American male writers
20th-century American screenwriters